The Boys' Brigade Gazette is a quarterly magazine printed regularly since 1889 in the United Kingdom for the officers and leaders of the Battalions and Companies of the Boy's Brigade in the UK and Ireland.

References

External links
 Official website
 WorldCat record

1889 establishments in the United Kingdom
Boys' Brigade
Quarterly magazines published in the United Kingdom
Magazines established in 1889